The 2019 All-Big Ten Conference football team consists of American football players chosen as All-Big Ten Conference players for the 2019 Big Ten Conference football season.  The conference recognizes two official All-Big Ten selectors: (1) the Big Ten conference coaches selected separate offensive and defensive units and named first-, second- and third-team players (the "Coaches" team); and (2) a panel of sports writers and broadcasters covering the Big Ten also selected offensive and defensive units and named first-, second- and third-team players (the "Media" team).

Offensive selections

Quarterbacks
 Justin Fields, Ohio State (Coaches-1; Media-1)
 Tanner Morgan, Minnesota (Coaches-2; Media-2)
 Shea Patterson, Michigan (Coaches-3; Media-3)

Running backs
 J. K. Dobbins, Ohio State (Coaches-1; Media-1)
 Jonathan Taylor, Wisconsin (Coaches-1; Media-1)
 Stevie Scott III, Indiana (Coaches-2; Media-2)
 Rodney Smith, Minnesota (Coaches-2; Media-2)
 Master Teague, Ohio State (Coaches-3; Media-3)
 Zach Charbonnet, Michigan (Media-3)
 Elijah Collins, Michigan State (Media-3)
 Reggie Corbin, Illinois (Coaches-3)

Wide receivers
 Rashod Bateman, Minnesota (Coaches-1; Media-1)
 Tyler Johnson, Minnesota (Coaches-1; Media-1)
 K. J. Hamler, Penn State (Coaches-2; Media-2)
 David Bell, Purdue (Coaches-3; Media-2)
 Whop Philyor, Indiana (Coaches-2; Media-3)
 Chris Olave, Ohio State (Coaches-3; Media-3)

Centers
 Tyler Biadasz, Wisconsin (Coaches-1; Media-1)
 Josh Myers, Ohio State (Coaches-3; Media-2)
 Cesar Ruiz, Michigan (Coaches-2; Media-3)

Guards
 Ben Bredeson, Michigan (Coaches-1; Media-1)
 Wyatt Davis, Ohio State (Coaches-2; Media-1)
 Jonah Jackson, Ohio State (Coaches-1; Media-2)
 Steven Gonzalez, Penn State (Coaches-2; Media-2)
 Blaise Andries, Minnesota (Coaches-3; Media-3)
 Michael Onwenu, Michigan (Coaches-3)
 Simon Stepaniak, Indiana (Media-3)

Tackles
 Jon Runyan Jr., Michigan (Coaches-1; Media-1)
 Tristan Wirfs, Iowa (Coaches-1; Media-1)
 Thayer Munford, Ohio State (Coaches-2; Media-2)
 Branden Bowen, Ohio State (Coaches-2; Media-3)
 Cole Van Lanen, Wisconsin (Media-2)
 Alaric Jackson, Iowa (Coaches-3; Media-3)
 Alex Palczewski, Illinois (Coaches-3)

Tight ends
 Brycen Hopkins, Purdue (Coaches-1; Media-1)
 Pat Freiermuth, Penn State (Coaches-2; Media-2)
 Luke Farrell, Ohio State (Coaches-3)
 Peyton Hendershot, Indiana (Media-3)

Defensive selections

Defensive linemen
 A. J. Epenesa, Iowa (Coaches-1; Media-1)
 Yetur Gross-Matos, Penn State (Coaches-1; Media-1)
 Chase Young, Ohio State (Coaches-1; Media-1)
 Joe Gaziano, Northwestern (Coaches-1; Media-2)
 Kenny Willekes, Michigan State (Coaches-2; Media-1)
 Carter Coughlin, Minnesota (Coaches-2; Media-2)
 Kwity Paye, Michigan (Coaches-2; Media-3)
 Raequan Williams, Michigan State (Coaches-3; Media-2)
 George Karlaftis, Purdue (Media-2)
 Shaka Toney, Penn State (Coaches-2)
 DaVon Hamilton, Ohio State (Coaches-3; Media-3)
 Oluwole Betiku Jr., Illinois (Media-3)
 Khalil Davis, Nebraska (Coaches-3)
 Aidan Hutchinson, Michigan (Media-3)
 Carlo Kemp, Michigan (Coaches-3)
 Robert Windsor, Penn State (Coaches-3)

Linebackers
 Zack Baun, Wisconsin (Coaches-1; Media-1)
 Micah Parsons, Penn State (Coaches-1; Media-1)
 Malik Harrison, Ohio State (Coaches-1; Media-2)
 Dele Harding, Illinois (Coaches-3; Media-1)
 Chris Orr, Wisconsin (Coaches-2; Media-2)
 Paddy Fisher, Northwestern (Coaches-3; Media-2)
 Khaleke Hudson, Michigan (Coaches-2; Media-3)
 Josh Uche, Michigan (Coaches-2; Media-3)
 Joe Bachie, Michigan State (Media-3)
 Cam Brown, Penn State (Coaches-3)

Defensive backs
 Jordan Fuller, Ohio State (Coaches-1; Media-1)
 Lavert Hill, Michigan (Coaches-1; Media-1)
 Antoine Winfield Jr., Minnesota (Coaches-1; Media-1)
 Jeff Okudah, Ohio State (Coaches-1; Media-1)
 Damon Arnette, Ohio State (Coaches-2; Media-2)
 Lamar Jackson, Nebraska (Coaches-2; Media-2)
 Antoine Brooks, Maryland (Coaches-2; Media-3)
 Michael Ojemudia, Iowa (Coaches-3; Media-2)
 Josiah Scott, Michigan State (Media-2)
 Geno Stone, Iowa (Coaches-2)
 Shaun Wade, Ohio State (Coaches-3; Media-3)
 Sydney Brown, Illinois (Coaches-3)
 Tariq Castro-Fields, (Media-3)
 Josh Metellus, Michigan (Media-3)
 Ambry Thomas, Michigan (Coaches-3)

Special teams

Kickers
 Keith Duncan, Iowa (Coaches-1; Media-1)
 Logan Justus, Indiana (Coaches-2; Media-2)
 Blake Haubeil, Ohio State (Coaches-3; Media-3)

Punters
 Blake Hayes, Illinois (Coaches-1; Media-1)
 Will Hart, Michigan (Coaches-3; Media-2)
 Adam Korsak, Rutgers (Coaches-2; Media-3)

Return specialist
 Javon Leake, Maryland (Coaches-1; Media-1)
 Aron Cruickshank, Wisconsin (Coaches-2; Media-2)
 Dre Brown, Illinois (Coaches-3)
 Donovan Peoples-Jones, Michigan (Media-3)

Key

See also
 2019 College Football All-America Team

References

All-Big Ten Conference
All-Big Ten Conference football teams